The Doug Wickenheiser Memorial Trophy is an annual award given to the Western Hockey League humanitarian of the year.  The winner is the player who best shows a commitment to his community and to humanitarian values. The award received its current name in May 2001 when it was renamed in honour of Doug Wickenheiser, who died of cancer in 1999.

Winners

Blue background denotes also named CHL Humanitarian of the Year

See also
CHL Humanitarian of the Year – First awarded in 1992–93
Dan Snyder Memorial Trophy – Ontario Hockey League Humanitarian of the Year
QMJHL Humanitarian of the Year

References

Western Hockey League trophies and awards
Humanitarian and service awards